Challenge Me (foaled 1941) was an American Thoroughbred racehorse  who won top races in 1944 including the Oaklawn Handicap which he won by ten lengths while setting a new track record. He followed up with a win in the Arkansas Derby In 1945 he added to his win total with a victory in that fall's Hollywood Gold Cup.

References

1941 racehorse births
Thoroughbred family 22-c
Racehorses bred in Kentucky
Racehorses trained in the United States